Spyboy is a 1998 live album by Emmylou Harris and her backing band, Spyboy, which she formed for a tour to perform songs from her 1995 career-redefining album, Wrecking Ball. Taking a stripped-down approach, Harris is backed by a trio comprising country singer-songwriter Buddy Miller on guitar and New Orleans musicians Daryl Johnson on bass and Brady Blade on drums. Along with songs from Wrecking Ball, such as "Where Will I Be" and "Deeper Well", Harris performs other songs from earlier in her career, such as "Born to Run" from Cimarron,  "Love Hurts", which she first performed with Gram Parsons, "I Ain't Living Long Like This" from Quarter Moon in a Ten Cent Town and her ode to Parsons, "Boulder to Birmingham", from her 1975 debut album, Pieces of the Sky.

Track listing

Personnel

Spyboy
 Emmylou Harris - lead vocals, acoustic guitar
 Buddy Miller - electric guitar, backing vocals
 Daryl Johnson - electric bass, bass pedals, djembe, percussion, backing vocals
 Brady Blade - drum kit, percussion, backing vocals

Additional personnel
 Julie Miller - backing vocals on "All My Tears (Be Washed Away)"

Chart performance

References

Emmylou Harris live albums
1998 live albums